Morulininae is a subfamily of springtails in the family Neanuridae. There are at least 2 genera and about 11 described species in Morulininae.

Genera
These two genera belong to the subfamily Morulininae:
 Morulina Borner, 1906
 Promorulina Cassagnau, 1997

References

Further reading

 

Neanuridae
Arthropod subfamilies